John "Johnny" Stopford (23 August 1936 – 21 August 1998) was an English professional rugby league footballer who played in the 1950s and 1960s, and coached in the 1970s and 1980s. Stopford formed a highly successful left-wing partnership with his left-, and fellow Great Britain international, Alan Buckley. He coached at representative level for Wellington and at club level for Swinton.

Background
Stopford was born in Wigan, Lancashire, England, and he died aged 61 in Wigan.

Playing career

International honours
Stopford won caps for Great Britain while at Swinton in 1961 against France, in 1963 against France and Australia (two matches), in 1964 against France (two matches), in 1965 against France, and New Zealand (two matches), and in 1966 against France (two matches), and on the 1966 Great Britain Lions tour against Australia.

Four Swinton players took part in the 1966 Great Britain Lions tour to Australasia, Stopford, Buckley, Ken Gowers (vice-captain) and Dave Robinson.

Career records
Stopford holds Swinton's "Most Tries in a rugby league Season" record, with 42 tries scored during the 1963–64 season. However, Jim Valentine holds Swinton's "Most Tries in a rugby union Season" record, with 48 tries scored during the 1888–89 season.

References

External links
Great Britain Statistics at Englandrl (statistics currently missing due to not having appeared for both Great Britain and England)
Championship winning team of 1964

1936 births
1998 deaths
English rugby league coaches
English rugby league players
Great Britain national rugby league team players
Rugby league players from Wigan
Rugby league wingers
Swinton Lions coaches
Swinton Lions players
Wellington rugby league team coaches